Hothian  is a village in Tarn taran district of Punjab State, India. The village is administrated by a Sarpanch, who is an elected representative.

Demography 
According to the report published by Census India in 2011, Hothian has total number of 108 houses and population of 560 of which include 286 males and 274 females. Literacy rate of Hothian is 72.78%, lower than state average of 75.84%.  The population of children under the age of 6 years is 75 which is 13.39% of total population of Hothian, and child sex ratio is approximately 630, lower than state average of 846.

Population data

Air travel connectivity 
The closest airport to the village is Sri Guru Ram Dass Jee International Airport.

Villages in Kapurthala

References

External links
  Villages in Kapurthala
 Kapurthala Villages List

Villages in Kapurthala district